Meagher County is a county located in the U.S. state of Montana. As of the 2020 census, the population was 1,927. Its county seat is White Sulphur Springs.

According to the United States Census Bureau, the 2010 center of population of Montana is located in Meagher County at

History
Meagher County was named for Thomas Francis Meagher, territorial governor of Montana.

The first county seat was Diamond City, the main city of the Confederate Gulch mining district. This area is no longer part of Meagher County, but today lies in neighboring Broadwater County.

Geography

Major highways

  U.S. Highway 12
  U.S. Highway 89

Adjacent counties

 Cascade County - north
 Judith Basin County - northeast
 Wheatland County - east
 Sweet Grass County - southeast
 Park County - south
 Gallatin County - south
 Broadwater County - west
 Lewis and Clark County - northwest

National protected areas
 Gallatin National Forest (part)
 Helena National Forest (part)
 Lewis and Clark National Forest (part)

Politics
This county has a strong Republican lean. This was one of 12 counties in Montana that Barry Goldwater won in 1964. A Democrat has not won since Franklin D. Roosevelt in 1940.

Demographics

2000 census
As of the 2000 census, there were 1,932 people, 803 households, and 529 families in the county. The population density was <1/km2 (1/sq mi). There were 1,363 housing units at an average density of <1/km2 (1/sq mi). The racial makeup of the county was 97.20% White, 1.04% Native American, 0.16% Asian, 0.05% Pacific Islander, 0.57% from other races, and 0.98% from two or more races. 1.50% of the population were Hispanic or Latino of any race. 28.8% were of German, 14.5% Norwegian, 13.3% English, 12.4% Irish and 7.8% American ancestry.

There were 803 households, out of which 27.30% had children under the age of 18 living with them, 56.80% were married couples living together, 6.10% had a female householder with no husband present, and 34.10% were non-families. 31.00% of all households were made up of individuals, and 13.70% had someone living alone who was 65 years of age or older. The average household size was 2.37 and the average family size was 3.00.

The county population contained 25.00% under the age of 18, 6.10% from 18 to 24, 22.70% from 25 to 44, 28.10% from 45 to 64, and 18.20% who were 65 years of age or older. The median age was 43 years. For every 100 females there were 100.40 males. For every 100 females age 18 and over, there were 100.40 males.

The median income for a household in the county was $29,375, and the median income for a family was $33,879. Males had a median income of $22,083 versus $15,417 for females. The per capita income for the county was $15,019. About 16.40% of families and 18.90% of the population were below the poverty line, including 27.40% of those under age 18 and 13.00% of those age 65 or over.

2010 census
As of the 2010 census, there were 1,891 people, 806 households, and 509 families in the county. The racial makeup of the county was 97.9% white, 0.3% Asian, 0.3% American Indian, 0.1% black or African American, 0.1% from other races, and 1.3% from two or more races. Those of Hispanic or Latino origin made up 1.5% of the population. In terms of ancestry, 38.6% were German, 14.3% were Norwegian, 13.6% were Irish, 11.0% were English, 5.9% were Scotch-Irish, and 3.2% were American.

Of the 806 households, 20.8% had children under the age of 18 living with them, 54.6% were married couples living together, 6.2% had a female householder with no husband present, 36.8% were non-families, and 33.3% of all households were made up of individuals. The average household size was 2.13 and the average family size was 2.67. The median age was 50.1 years.

The median income for a household in the county was $31,577 and the median income for a family was $40,057. Males had a median income of $30,556 versus $16,414 for females. The per capita income for the county was $17,318. About 14.1% of families and 19.0% of the population were below the poverty line, including 21.7% of those under age 18 and 13.0% of those age 65 or over.

Communities

City
 White Sulphur Springs (county seat)

Census-designated places
 Martinsdale
 Springdale Colony

Other unincorporated communities

 Castle Town
 Checkerboard
 Copperopolis
 Fort Logan
 Hamen
 Lennep
 Loweth
 Minden
 Moss Agate
 Moyne
 Ringling
 Sixteen

Individual residences (identified on aerial map)
 Ford Place

See also
 List of lakes in Meagher County, Montana
 Confederate Gulch and Diamond City (historically in Meagher County, but now in Broadwater County)
 List of mountains in Meagher County, Montana
 National Register of Historic Places listings in Meagher County, Montana

References

 
Montana counties on the Missouri River
1867 establishments in Montana Territory
Populated places established in 1867